Norbert Sipos (born 21 March 1981 in Szombathely) is a Hungarian football player who plays for BFC Siófok.

Honours  
Hungarian second division:  Winner: 2008

References 
HLSZ
Sipos Transfer in Nea Salamis Famagusta

1981 births
Living people
Sportspeople from Szombathely
Hungarian footballers
Hungary youth international footballers
Association football midfielders
Szombathelyi Haladás footballers
Büki TK Bükfürdő footballers
Celldömölki VSE footballers
Lombard-Pápa TFC footballers
FC Sopron players
FC Tatabánya players
Nyíregyháza Spartacus FC players
Pécsi MFC players
Nea Salamis Famagusta FC players
BFC Siófok players
FC Ajka players
Nemzeti Bajnokság I players
Cypriot First Division players
Hungarian expatriate footballers
Expatriate footballers in Cyprus
Hungarian expatriate sportspeople in Cyprus